Moira Placchi is an Italian retired football defender who played for CF Bardolino and ACF Porto Mantovano in Serie A.

She was a member of the Italian national team in the qualifying stages for the 2003 World Cup and the 2005 European Championship. Placchi scored the winner against Yugoslavia that qualified Italy for the latter's repechage play-offs, but she was not called up for the finals.

References

1970 births
Living people
Italian women's footballers
Italy women's international footballers
Serie A (women's football) players
A.S.D. AGSM Verona F.C. players
Women's association football defenders